The Bafour or Bafur are a group of people inhabiting Mauritania and Western Sahara. Their origins most likely ultimately lie in the Mandé peoples, only to later be absorbed by groups such as the Wolof, Serer, Fulani, or Tuareg. Scholars such as H.T. Norris describe "Bafur (Bafour)" as a loose term to encompass the pre-Sanhaja peoples, who were "part Berber, part Negro, and part Semite." And others describe them as Mandé agriculturalists who inhabited the area prior to the arrival of the Berbers. Others say they occupied these territories in the 15th century and, before the end of the 17th century, and were comprised by various groups, including the Wolof, Berber and Fula.

History
The Bafour were a settled people at the time of the Neolithic Era. According to their oral tradition, they lived in the Western Sahara and gradually migrated southward.  Charles Mwalimu describes them as "African black Agriculturalists...subsequently replaced by the Berber". Anthony Pazzanita refers to them as "a pastoral, pre-Berber people who migrated to the area during Neolithic times", ancestors of the Soninke people and other Mandé peoples. 

Twentieth-century historians have suggested that they may have been inhabitants of this territory in western Africa before the Islamic period. French art historian Jean Laude wrote, "In the pre-Islamic period (before the ninth century), according to oral tradition, Mauritania was occupied by the Bafour, a population of possibly mixed origin from whom the eastern Songhai, the central Gangara, and the western Serer are derived."

Historian James L.A. Webb writes, 
"During the more humid period from c. 1450 or 1500 to c. 1600. the lands of the central and northern Gibla came to be settled once again, this time apparently by Bafur villagers. Bafur place-names and desert traditions about the Bafur survive, but little else. The ethnic identity of the Bafur apparently was transformed in the period before the late seventeenth century and absorbed into the ethnic categories of Wolof, Berber, and Fula, and thus remains somewhat mysterious."They are at times referred to as the descendants of local pre-Berber peoples.

According to Webb's study of oral traditions, from 1600 to 1850, in the pre-colonial period, there was a well-established commercial route between communities of the Seenegambia reaching north to the Western Sahara and Mauritania. Over four centuries before that, Arabs mixed with Bafur and Berber Masufa in Wadan, in present-day Western Sahara. A group known as Idaw al-Hajj ("sons of pilgrims" in Hassaniya) gradually settled in trading areas of northwestern Senegal, from where they dominated the gum arabic trade, as well as shipment of grain from the Wolof region to the Bidan (white North Africans), and a trade between Wolofs and the Maghreb for horses for their military campaigns. As is common among trading peoples, over time intermarriage had taken place between the Idaw al-Hajj and Wolof peoples, and the northerners gradually became assimilated into the sub-Saharan African community, including the use of Wolof as their language.

Notes

Further reading
UNESCO General History of Africa, Vol. III, Abridged Edition: Africa from ... edited by M. El Fasi UNESCO General History of Africa, Vol. III, Abridged Edition: Africa from the Seventh to the Eleventh Century
Desert Frontier: Ecological And Economic Change Along The Western Sahel ... By James L.A., Jr. Webb Desert Frontier: Ecological and Economic Change Along the Western Sahel, 1600-1850
Ethnic Groups of Africa and the Middle East: An Encyclopedia By John A. Shoup Ethnic Groups of Africa and the Middle East: An Encyclopedia

Ethnic groups in Mauritania
History of Mauritania
Ancient peoples
Mandé people
Wolof people
Serer people
Fula